Marco Antonio González Junquera (born 9 July 1966 in Barcelona, Catalonia) is a former water polo player from Spain. He was a member of the national team that won the silver medal near his home town, at the 1992 Summer Olympics in Barcelona, Spain. Four years earlier, when Seoul hosted the Games, he was on the squad that finished in fifth position.

See also
 List of Olympic medalists in water polo (men)
 List of World Aquatics Championships medalists in water polo

References
 Spanish Olympic Committee

External links
 

1966 births
Living people
Spanish male water polo players
Olympic water polo players of Spain
Water polo players at the 1988 Summer Olympics
Water polo players at the 1992 Summer Olympics
Olympic silver medalists for Spain
Water polo players from Barcelona
Olympic medalists in water polo
Medalists at the 1992 Summer Olympics
20th-century Spanish people
Sportsmen from Catalonia